he 2006 IAAF World Race Walking Cup was held on 13 and 14 May 2006 in the streets of A Coruña, Spain.
Detailed reports on the event and an appraisal of the results was given for the IAAF.

Complete results were published.

Medallists

Results

Men's 20 km

Team (20 km Men)

Men's 50 km

Team (50 km Men)

Men's 10 km (Junior)

Team (10 km Men Junior)

Women's 20 km

Team (20km Women)

Women's 10 km Junior

Team (10km Women Junior)

Participation
The participation of 393 athletes (257 men/136 women) from 58 countries is reported.

 (1/-)
 (11/8)
 (7/6)
 (1/-)
 (-/1)
 (1/-)
 (2/-)
 (2/1)
 (1/-)
 (12/6)
 (4/4)
 (2/-)
 (2/1)
 (1/-)
 (1/1)
 (8/4)
 (-/1)
 (2/2)
 (4/3)
 (3/1)
 (3/2)
 (13/2)
 (4/2)
 (5/4)
 (4/1)
 (8/7)
 (3/2)
 (13/7)
 (3/1)
 (1/1)
 (4/1)
 (7/4)
 (2/-)
 (2/1)
 (12/1)
 (1/-)
 (1/-)
 (2/-)
 (1/-)
 (10/3)
 (8/6)
 (3/1)
 (2/-)
 (-/4)
 (13/8)
 (1/-)
 (2/4)
 (3/2)
 (5/-)
 (13/6)
 (-/1)
 (4/1)
 (6/2)
 (2/-)
 (3/3)
 (12/7)
 (2/4)
 (13/8)

See also
 2006 Race Walking Year Ranking

References

External links
Official IAAF website for the 2006 IAAF World Race Walking Cup
Results - IAAF.org

World Athletics Race Walking Team Championships
World Race Walking Cup
Walking
International athletics competitions hosted by Spain